Convoy FS 559 was a British convoy in World War II. On the night of 5 August 1941, six merchant ships from the convoy ran aground on the Haisborough Sands. The Cromer second lifeboat Harriot Dixon and the Great Yarmouth and Gorleston lifeboat Louise Stephens between them rescued a further 31 men.

References

FS 559